Julia Balbilla (Greek: Ἰουλία Βαλβίλλα, AD 72 – after AD 130) was a Roman noble woman and poet. Whilst in Thebes, touring Egypt as part of the imperial court of Hadrian, she inscribed three epigrams which have survived.

Family and early life
Balbilla's family were well-connected members of the royal family of the Kingdom of Commagene, a principality in what is now Turkey which was annexed by the Roman Empire. As well as Egyptian and Greek elements, Balbilla's ancestry included Armenian, Median, Syrian and Seleucian lines. Balbilla was the second child of Gaius Julius Archelaus Antiochus Epiphanes and Claudia Capitolina, a Greek woman born in Alexandria. Her older brother was Gaius Julius Antiochus Epiphanes Philopappos, one of the first men of eastern descent to become consul at Rome.

Balbilla's parents were distant cousins. Claudia Capitolina's paternal grandmother was Aka II of Commagene, the great-granddaughter of Antiochus I Theos of Commagene. Balbilla's father, was the first born child of Antiochus IV of Commagene and Julia Iotapa of Commagene. Both Antiochus IV and Iotapa were descendants of Antiochus I Theos.

Balbilla's maternal grandfather, after whom she was named, was Tiberius Claudius Balbilus, a Greek of Egyptian descent. He was an astrologer and a learned scholar. He became one of the highest ranking magistrates of the Equestrian order and was Prefect of Egypt from AD 55 to 59. Balbilus and his father, Thrasyllus of Mendes (Tiberius Claudius Thrasyllus), a grammarian and astrologer were friends of the first Roman emperors including Tiberius, Claudius and Vespasian.

Balbilla's paternal grandparents, Antiochus IV of Commagene and Queen Julia Iotapa were puppet rulers under Rome. Balbilla was born and raised in Rome in the household of her paternal grandfather, Antiochus IV. Prior to Balbilla's birth, Vespasian had ordered Antiochus IV to abdicate the throne of Commagene because of his alleged disloyalty to Rome. Antiochus IV and his brother, Callinicus, were accused of colluding with the Kingdom of Parthia against Rome. It is unknown whether these accusations were true. Vespasian gave Antiochus IV sufficient revenue for a luxurious life in Rome. This afforded Balbilla and her brother a traditional Greek education.

The family later moved to Athens where Balbilla's father, Epiphanes, died at 92 years of age of unknown causes. Capitolina then returned to Alexandria where she married Marcus Junius Rufus, a Roman politician. Capitolina spent her remaining years in Alexandria. Balbilla lived with her for a time then returned to the home of her brother, Philopappos, in Athens.

Despite her aristocratic life, Balbilla's status in Rome may not have been secure as her father was not a senator. However, Philopappos did become a senator, serving as a consul until AD 109. When Philopappos died in AD 116, Balbilla built for him a burial monument, the Philopappos Monument, on Musaios Hill, south-west of the Acropolis in Athens. Later, Balbilla married an aristocrat in Athens with no issue.

The Epigrams

Balbilla was a court poet and friend of Hadrian and companion or lady in waiting to his wife, Vibia Sabina. In AD 129, she accompanied them to the Valley of the Kings in Ancient Egypt. Balbilla was commissioned to record the party's return visit from 19 to 21 November 130. Balbilla inscribed three epigrams in Aeolic Greek, known as 'epigrammata', on the legs of the Colossi of Memnon. The statue may have reminded Balbilla of the sculptures on Mount Nemrut and the mausoleum of her ancestor, Antiochus I Theos of Commagene, the descendants of whom she references in her poems. Although the epigrammata were approved public inscriptions, in honor of the Roman imperial family, they are somewhat akin to graffiti. They have elements of wit, history and mythology written in an Homeric tone. The poems display good use of metaphors, verbal and sound echoes. Inspired by Sappho, Balbilla also used traditional lyric themes: the love of songs and a liking for the Muses.

The first and second epigrams tell the story of a mythical king of Ethiopia Memnon, killed by Achilles at Troy and whom the God Zeus made immortal. Balbilla is not addressing Memnon but is flattering Hadrian and Sabina.

Balbilla dedicates the third epigram to her parents and grandfathers and to her noble bloodline.

After her poetry, no more is known about Balbilla.

A fourth epigram, in elegiac couplets, entitled and perhaps authored by a certain "Demo" or "Damo" is a dedication to the Muses. The poem is traditionally published with the works of Balbilla, though the internal evidence suggests a different author. In the poem, Demo explains that Memnon has shown her special respect. In return, Demo offers the gift for poetry, as a gift to the hero. At the end of this epigram, she addresses Memnon, highlighting his divine status by recalling his strength and holiness. Internal evidence on the leg of Memnon suggests that this poem was written at some point in or after AD 196.

Ancestry

Fictional references
 The Emperor by Georg Ebers (1880).
 The Memoirs of Hadrian by Marguerite Yourcenar (1951)
 Opus Gemini (part of the Romanike series) by Codex Regious (2014).
 The Glass Ball Game radio play (part of the Caesar! series by Mike Walker.

Further reading
 Julia Balbilla (2010) by Patricia Rosenmyer.
 Matrona Docta: Educated Women in the Roman Élite from Cornelia to Julia Domna (2004) by Emily Ann Hemelrijk.
 Memoirs of Hadrian (1951) by Marguerite Yourcenar.
 Early Roman Rule in Commagene by Michael A. Speidel 
 Hellenism and Empire: Language, Classicism, and Power in the Greek World, AD 50-250 (1996) by Simon Swain.
 Amalia Cirio, Gli epigrammi di Giulia Balbilla, Pensa Multimedia, 2011.
 Patricia A. Rosenmeyer, The Language of Ruins: Greek and Latin Inscriptions on the Memnon Colossus (2018).
Some images of the epigrams available at: https://egiptomaniacos.foroactivo.com/t4845-colosos-de-memnon-graffiti and http://nefertiti-returns.blogspot.com/2009/09/graffiti-carved-on-foot-of-memnon.html

References

72 births
130 deaths
Hellenistic-era people
Commagene people
Roman-era Athenians
Balbilla
1st-century Romans
2nd-century Romans
2nd-century poets
2nd-century women writers
2nd-century writers
Italian women poets
1st-century women writers
1st-century writers
Ancient Roman women writers
Ancient women poets
Ancient Roman poets
2nd-century Roman women
1st-century Roman women
Greek-language poets